Siphonini is a tribe of flies in the family Tachinidae.

Genera
Actia Robineau-Desvoidy, 1830
Aphantorhaphopsis Townsend, 1926
Ceranthia Robineau-Desvoidy, 1830
Ceromya Robineau-Desvoidy, 1830
Entomophaga Lioy, 1864
Goniocera Brauer & Bergenstamm, 1891
Peribaea Robineau-Desvoidy, 1863
Proceromyia Mensil, 1957
Siphona Meigen, 1803

References

Brachyceran flies of Europe
Brachycera tribes
Tachininae
Taxa named by Camillo Rondani